The Congregation of Pious Workers Rural Catechists or Ardorini Missionaries (in Latin Congregatio Piorum Operariorum Catechistarum Ruralium) are a Roman Catholic religious order. They use the post-nominal initials P.O.C.R.

The congregation was founded in 1943 through the union of the Congregation of Pious Workers (founded by Charles Carafa in Naples in 1600 using the post-nominal initials C.P.O.) with the Congregation of Rural Catechists (founded by Gaetano Mauro in Montalto Uffugo in 1928).

History

Congregation of Pious Workers

Charles Carafa
Charles Carafa was born in 1561 and joined the Society of Jesus at the age of sixteen. After five years in the Society, constant ill-health forced him to leave. Eventually he decided to enter the army. One day while passing the Palazzo Reale di Napoli, he happened to hear the nuns chanting at the Monastery of Regina Caeli and stopped to listen. Carafa decided to make a change and at the age of thirty-four, took up the study of philosophy and theology. Five years later he was ordained. After this his life became a constant exercise of charity and zeal. Cardinal Giesualdo, seeing his good work, assigned him to the church of Santa Maria di Tutti i Beni. Several ecclesiastics who were under his spiritual guidance left their homes to live with him and aid him in his apostolic labors, which the archbishop allowed.

In 1601 Caraffa opened his church, and, with eight priests, he began to work. He faced many trials: he was misrepresented at Rome; he had to leave the church which had been given to him, and most of his disciples abandoned him. But he kept up his courage, rented a house and continued his work with three companions, who had remained faithful. Some time after, his perseverance was rewarded by new accessions to his community. This enabled him to establish several houses of his congregation. He obtained for it the approbation of Pope Gregory XV by a Brief of 1621. It received the title of Congregation of the Pious Workers. After a life of great merit, spent in works of charity, he died on 8 September 1633.

"Pious Workers" 
The congregation, originally known as "the Christian doctrine", was founded near Naples around 1600 by Carlo Carafa (1561-1633) for the service of the poor and the teaching of catechism in rural areas. The institute received pontifical recognition in 1606. In 1617 the Church of San Giorgio Maggiore in Naples was offered to the fathers as its headquarters. The congregation was approved on 1 April 1621 by Pope Gregory XV, who changed its title to "Pious Workers" (the religious, in addition to catechesis, dedicated themselves to works of charity and had added to their purposes the preaching of the popular missions in the countryside). 

The Pious Workers risked extinction during the plague epidemic of 1656, during which they worked hard to assist the infected and many caught the disease in turn; the congregation revived thanks to Pietro Gisolfo. In 1687 they had a seat in Rome, first at the Church of Santa Balbina, then at the parish of San Lorenzo ai Monti, and in 1732 in San Giuseppe alla Lungara. 

Although their apostolate was limited to the areas surrounding Rome and Naples and their number was limited (the institute almost never exceeded one hundred members), the Pious Workers had great prestige in the seventeenth and eighteenth centuries and their houses (especially St. Nicholas of Charity in Naples) were renowned centers of spirituality. With the constitution Inter Multiplices of December 14, 1792, Pope Pius VI extended to the Pious Workers all the privileges of the regular orders. 

The Pious Workers exercised a considerable influence on the nascent congregations of the Pious Teachers of Lucia Filippini and the Redemptorists (the Pious Workers were the bishops Emilio Giacomo Cavalieri, maternal uncle of Alfonso Maria de' Liguori, and Tommaso Falcoia, who contributed to the birth of the Redemptorist nuns). Alphonsus appears to have held the memory of Father Caraffa in great esteem, and appears to have copied the institute of the Pious Workers in several points when preparing the rules of his own congregation.

With the Napoleonic suppressions and the Savoy subversive laws, the congregation saw a considerable reduction in the number of its members, so much so that in 1943 only one Pio Operaio, Pasquale Ossorio, residing in San Nicola alla Carità, remained alive.

Congregation of Rural Catechists

In 1925 Gaetano Mauro (1888-1969) founded in Calabria the Religious Association of Rural Orators (A.R.D.O.R.), a company of priests and lay people for the teaching of catechism to farmers and to those who lived in remote areas. Some members of the association (called "ardorini") in 1928 began to lead a common life at the convent of San Francesco di Paola in Montalto Uffugo. 

On December 8, 1928 the ardorini of common life were constituted into a religious congregation, taking the name of "Rural Catechists", and on June 27, 1930 the institute obtained the approval of the Archbishop of Cosenza.

Union of the two congregations

To prevent the old congregation of the Pious Workers from becoming extinct, by decree of 28 June 1943 the Holy See united the Rural Catechists, who had the same aims; the Roman community of Rural Catechists moved to the church of San Giuseppe alla Lungara, while some Calabrian religious settled, together with the last Worker Pius, at the church of San Nicola della Carità. 

With the decree of union the Holy See appointed superior general of the new congregation Pasquale Ossorio; the ancient constitutions of the Pious Workers were abolished and replaced with those elaborated by Mauro in 1931.

Activity

The Ardorini Missionaries are dedicated to the social and religious assistance of rural populations and youth. They are present in Italy, Canada and Colombia. The headquarters is in Montalto Uffugo (Cosenza); in Rome,   Procurator General of the Congregation resides at the Church of San Giuseppe alla Lungara in Rome.

As of December 31, 2008, the congregation had 7 houses with 39 religious, 33 of whom were priests.

References

Bibliography
 Annuario Pontificio per l'anno 2010, Libreria Editrice Vaticana, Città del Vaticano 2010. .
 Guerrino Pelliccia e Giancarlo Rocca (curr.), Dizionario degli Istituti di Perfezione (10 voll.),  Edizioni paoline, Milan, 1974–2003.

Catholic orders and societies